"Bésame Siempre" is a song by Dominican singer Henry Santos. It was released in 2013 and served as the second single for his second album My Way (2013).

Charts

References

2013 songs
2013 singles
Henry Santos songs
Universal Music Latin Entertainment singles